Palumõisa (also known as Kirsi) was a village in present day Võru County. Today, the areas of the village remain in the villages of Lümatu and Vaabina. The village was abolished in 1977.

References

1977 disestablishments
Villages in Võru County
Former villages in Estonia